Lalmai Upazila is an upazila of Comilla District in the Division of Chittagong, Bangladesh. Lalmai is the 17th upazila of Comilla District and 491st upazila of the country. It was formed on 9 January 2017 from eight union parishads of Comilla Sadar Dakshin Upazila and one of Laksam Upazila.

The upazila has a population of 210,182. Muslims were 199,838 (95.08%), Hindus 7,262 (3.46%) and Buddhists 2,996 (1.43%).

Administrative Divisions 
It includes the 9 union parishads:

 Bagmara uttar
 Bagmara Dakshin
 Bholain Uttar
 Bholain Dakshin
 Perul Uttar
 Perul Dakshin
 Belghar Uttar
 Belghar Dakshin
 Bakai

References

Upazilas of Comilla District